Hipponix leptus is a species of small limpet-like sea snail, a marine gastropod mollusk in the family Hipponicidae, the hoof snails. The shell of this species is similar to that of Hipponix antiquatus.

Description

Distribution
Specimens have been found primarily in Brazil.

References

External links

Hipponicidae
Gastropods described in 2002